Polypsocus corruptus is a species of hairy-winged barklouse in the family Amphipsocidae. It is found in Central America and North America.

References

External links

 

Caeciliusetae
Articles created by Qbugbot
Insects described in 1861